Neptunium(IV) oxide, or neptunium dioxide, is a radioactive, olive green cubic crystalline solid with the formula NpO2. It  emits both α- and γ-particles.

Production 
Industrially, neptunium dioxide is formed by precipitation of neptunium(IV) oxalate, followed by calcination to neptunium dioxide.

Production starts with a nitric acid feed solution containing neptunium ions in various oxidation states.  First, a hydrazine inhibitor is added to slow any oxidation from standing in air.  Then ascorbic acid reduces the feed solution to predominantly neptunium(IV): 

2Np5+ + C6H8O6 → 2Np4+ + C6H6O6 + 2H+
Np6+ + C6H8O6 → Np4+ + C6H6O6 + 2H+
Addition of oxalic acid precipitates hydrated neptunium oxalate… 

Np4+ + 2H2C2O4 + 6H2O → Np(C2O4)2.6H2O(v) + 4H+ 
…which pyrolyzes when heated: 

Np(C2O4)2.6H2O  Np(C2O4)2  NpO2 + 2CO(g)

Neptunium dioxide can also be formed from precipitation of neptunium(IV) peroxide, but the process is much more sensitive.

Purification 

As a byproduct of nuclear waste, neptunium dioxide can be purified by fluorination, followed by reduction with excess calcium in the presence of iodine. However, the aforementioned synthesis yields a quite pure solid, with less than 0.3% mass fraction of impurities. Generally, further purification is unnecessary.

Other properties 

Neptunium dioxide contributes to the α-decay of 241Am, reducing its usual half-life an untested but appreciable amount. The compound has a low specific heat capacity (900 K, compared with uranium dioxide's specific heat capacity of 1400 K), an abnormality theorized to stem from its 5f electron count. Another unique trait of neptunium dioxide is its "mysterious low-temperature ordered phase". Mentioned above, it references an abnormal level of order for an actinitde dioxide complex at low temperature. Further discussion of such topics could indicate useful physical trends in the actinoides.

Uses 

The neptunium dioxide complex is used as a means of stabilizing, and decreasing the "long term environmental burden" of neptunium as a nuclear fission byproduct. Actinoide-containing nuclear waste will commonly be treated so that various AnO2 (where An = U, Np, Pu, Am, etc.) complexes form. In neptunium dioxide, neptunium is of reduced radio toxicity compared with elemental neptunium and is thus more desirable for storage and disposal. Neptunium dioxide has also been show to contribute to increased decay rates of radioactive elements, an application which is currently being explored.

Neptunium dioxide is also used experimentally for research into nuclear chemistry and physics, and it is speculated that it could be used to make efficient nuclear weapons. In nuclear reactors, neptunium dioxide can also be used as the target for plutonium bombardment.

Furthermore, a patent for a rocket powered by neptunium dioxide is held by Shirakawa Toshihisa, but there is little information available into research and production associated with such a product.

References 

Neptunium compounds
Oxides